The 2013–14 McNeese State Cowboys basketball team represented McNeese State University during the 2013–14 NCAA Division I men's basketball season. The Cowboys were led by eighth-year head coach Dave Simmons and played their home games at Burton Coliseum, with three home games at Sudduth Coliseum. They were members of the Southland Conference. They finished the season 11–20, 9–9 in Southland play to finish in eighth place. They lost in the first round of the Southland Conference tournament to Oral Roberts.

Roster

Schedule
Source

|-
!colspan=9 style=""|Regular season

|-
!colspan=9 style=""| Southland tournament

References

McNeese Cowboys basketball seasons
McNeese State
McNeese State
McNeese State